Praemastus roseicorpus is a moth in the subfamily Arctiinae. It was described by Rothschild in 1935. It is found in Venezuela.

References

Natural History Museum Lepidoptera generic names catalog

Moths described in 1935
Arctiinae